SV Vulpeculae is a classical Cepheid (δ Cepheid) variable star in the constellation Vulpecula.  It is a supergiant at a distance of 8,700 light years.

SV Vulpeculae is a δ Cepheid variable whose visual apparent magnitude ranges from 6.72 to 7.79 over 45.0121 days.  The light curve is highly asymmetric, with the rise from minimum to maximum taking more less than a third of the time for the fall from maximum to minimum.  The period has been decreasing on average by 214 seconds/year.

The mass of SV Vulpeculae is now near , and is estimated to have been about  when it was on the main sequence.  The rate of change of the period and the atmospheric abundances show that the star is crossing the instability strip for the second time.  The first instability strip crossing occurs rapidly during the transition from the main sequence to becoming a red supergiant.  The second crossing occurs during core helium burning when the star executes a blue loop, becoming hotter for a time before returning to the red supergiant stage.

References

Vulpecula
Classical Cepheid variables
Vulpeculae, SV
G-type supergiants
187921
F-type supergiants
K-type supergiants
097717
Durchmusterung objects